The North Pole Marathon is run over the classic  marathon distance at the North Pole.  The race is run on small,  loop about 10 times over hard snow or the frozen ice of the Arctic Ocean. There are individual competitions with male and female divisions, and a team competition for teams of three or more. There is also an option to run a half marathon.

The North Pole Marathon has been recognized by Guinness World Records as the "Northernmost Marathon on Earth".

History
The first unofficial North Pole Marathon was a 'solo' run by Richard Donovan on April 5, 2002, in a time of 3:48:12. Richard won the first South Pole Marathon ten weeks previously and became the first marathoner at both poles by completing the North Pole Marathon.

The first official exploratory competitive race held on April 17, 2003, and was operated jointly by several entities with 10 competitors.

In 2005, the North Pole Marathon was cancelled due to a dispute between French and Russian logistics operators.

Results

Past winners
Key:

2015
Men's Marathon
1.	Petr Vabrousek (CZE)	4.22.24	
2.	Douglas Wilson (AUS)	5.01.38	
3.	Daniel Palko (SVK)	5.08.56	

Women's Marathon
1.	Heather Hawkins (AUS)	6.57.39	
2.	Alice Burch (GBR)	7.04.42	
3.	Jennifer Cheung (HKG /HONG KONG)	7.06.06	

Team Competition
1.	Vemma Europe (Grabowski, Maier, Reilly)	24.15.59

Women's Half Marathon
1.	Tanj Donovan (IRL)		
2.	Karen Curtis (USA)		
3.	Annie Rawlinson (GBR)

2014
Men's Marathon
1.	Michael Wardian (USA)	4:07:40	
2.	Luke Wigman (GBR)	5:03:55	
3.	Patrick Cande (TAH)	5:46:19	

Women's Marathon
1.	Anne-Marie Flammersfeld (GER)	4:52:45	
2.	Anna Wester (NED)	7:57:50	
3.	Shona Thomson (GBR)	9:09:22	

Team Competition
1.	UVU Racing Team (Wardian, Flammersfeld, Hinett)	16:41:01
2.	Team EEK (Dorran, Hunt, Kemp)	25:25:44

Men's Half Marathon
1.	Ian Egan (IRL)	3:41:07	
2.	Paul Langan (IRL)	4:18:00	
3.	Yusuke Mamada (JPN)	4:29:10	

Women's Half Marathon
1.	Pia-Margit Hegner (SUI)	3:42:00	
2.	Mary Grealish (IRL)	4:23:27	
3.	Orla Murphy (IRL)	5:41:14

2013
Men's Marathon
1.	Gary Thornton (IRL)	3:49:29	
2.	Renaud Michel (FRA)	4:34:29	
3.	Willy Steinskog (NOR)	5:04:07

Women's Marathon
1.	Fiona Oakes (GBR)	4:53:10	
2.	Stephanie Gicquel (FRA)	5:48:56	
3.	Anna Chernova (GBR)	7:27:09	

Team Competition
1.	UVU Racing Team	14:22:53
2.	Green Monday / Convoy Hong Kong Team	21:20:57

Men's Half Marathon
1.	Jeremy Cashen (NZL)	3:27:17	
2.	Dennis Andrade (USA)	4:17:26	

Women's Half Marathon
1.	Elaine Barrett (IRL)	4:54:16	

North Pole Ski Marathon
1.	Miguel Caselles (ESP)	6:54:20

2012
Men's Marathon
1.	Andrew Murray (GBR)	4:17:08	
2.	Luis Alonso Marcos (ESP)4:19:38	
3.	James Matthews (GBR)	4:41:01	

Women's Marathon
1.	Demelza Farr (AUS)	6:06:36	
2.	Rebecca Newman (GBR)	6:11:39	
3.	Julie Brailsford (GBR)	6:14:40

2011
Men's Marathon
1.	Istvan Toth (HUN)	4:54:03	
2.	John Braun (LUX)	5:05:50	
3.	Dmitry Mamadaliev (RUS)	5:05:53	

Women's Marathon
1.	Richelle Turner (AUS)	6:03:06	
2.	Sharyn Fitzgerald (AUS)	6:28:16	
3.	Sue Bradford (GBR)	7:14:24	

Team Competition
1. The Arctic Challengers (Great Britain)

2010
Men's Marathon 
1.	Joep Rozendal (Netherlands)	5:00:58	
2.	Rik Vercoe (Great Britain)	5:07:30	
3.	Yen-Po Chen (Taiwan)	        5:29:47	

Women's Marathon
1.	Emer Dooley (Ireland)	        5:56:54	
2.	Julia Tizard (Great Britain)	7:31:05	
3.	Sarah Oliphant (USA)	        7:58:14	

Team Competition
1. Team Centrepoint (Great Britain) - Carnie, Boyne, Bolton

Records
The men's record of 3:36:10 was set by Thomas Maguire (IRL) in 2007.

The women's record of 4:52:45 was set by Anne-Marie Flammersfeld (GER) in 2014.

Two guided blind athletes, Mark Pollock and Jamie Cuthbertson, completed the race in 2004 and 2010, respectively.

In 2007, William Tan - a wheelchair competitor - completed a marathon distance on the aircraft runway.

References

External links
 
 Audrey McIntosh: The North Pole Marathon - Audreys 2015 experience
 Arthur Kadar: This is the story of my first marathon: The North Pole Marathon. - Arthurs 2015 experience
 Pictures of the North Pole Marathon 2009 by competitor Rob Plijnaar

Marathons
Arctic challenges
Sport in the Arctic